The 1990–91 Quebec Nordiques season was the Nordiques 12th season in the National Hockey League.

Offseason
After finishing in last place in the NHL in 1989–90 with only 31 points, Quebec hired Pierre Page to become the general manager, as Maurice Filion finished the previous season on an interim basis.  Page had spent the previous two seasons as head coach of the Minnesota North Stars, helping them to the playoffs in each season with the team.

Page then fired head coach Michel Bergeron, and named his assistant coach from the North Stars, Dave Chambers, to be his head coach in Quebec. This would be Chambers first time as a head coach at the NHL level.

The Nordiques had the first overall pick in the 1990 NHL Entry Draft, and the club drafted Owen Nolan from the Cornwall Royals of the OHL.  Nolan had 51 goals and 110 points with the Royals in 59 games, as well as recording 240 penalty minutes.  The team also signed Mats Sundin, their first overall pick from the 1989 NHL Entry Draft, and would have him on the club for the 1990–91 season.

Regular season
Quebec began the season with a 3-3-3 record in their first nine games, however, the rebuilding team hit a rough patch, and would fall into last place in the Adams Division as they went on a 17-game winless streak.  The Nordiques began to make some trades, as Michel Petit, Aaron Broten and Lucien DeBlois were traded to the Toronto Maple Leafs for Scott Pearson, the Leafs second round pick in the 1991 NHL Entry Draft, and the Leafs second rounder in the 1992 NHL Entry Draft.

As the season continued on, the losses continued to pile up, and more trades were made.  Joe Cirella was traded to the New York Rangers for Aaron Miller and the Rangers fifth round draft pick in the 1991 NHL Entry Draft, Tony McKegney was sent to the Chicago Blackhawks for Jacques Cloutier, Darin Kimble was traded to the St. Louis Blues for Herb Raglan, Tony Twist and Andy Rymsha, and Paul Gillis and Dan Vincelette were traded to the Chicago Blackhawks for Ryan McGill and Mike McNeill.

The Nordiques finished the season in last place once again, however, there was moderate improvement, as the club had a 16-50-14 record, earning 46 points, which was a 15-point improvement over the 1989–90 season.

Leading the team offensively was Joe Sakic, as he had 48 goals and 61 assists for 109 points in 80 games to lead the club in those categories.  Rookie Mats Sundin had a very successful season, scoring 23 goals and 59 points while playing in all 80 games.  Guy Lafleur had 12 goals and 28 points in 59 games in his last season, as he announced his retirement.

On defense, Bryan Fogarty rebounded from a poor rookie season, and led the Nordiques blueline with 31 points in only 45 games.  Steven Finn had 19 points, while Craig Wolanin had 18 points from the Quebec defense.

In goal, Ron Tugnutt was the starter, earning a team high 12 wins and a team best 4.05 GAA.  In a game against the Boston Bruins on March 21, 1991, Tugnutt made a club record 70 saves on 73 shots, as Quebec tied the Bruins 3-3.

The Nordiques finished the regular season having allowed the most goals of all 21 teams, with 354. They also tied the New York Islanders for the fewest power-play goals scored (51), had the lowest power-play percentage (15.55%), allowed the most power-play goals (98) and had the lowest penalty-killing percentage (73.37%).

Final standings

Schedule and results

Player statistics

Transactions
The Nordiques were involved in the following transactions during the 1990–91 season.

Trades

Waivers

Expansion Draft

Free agents

Draft picks
Quebec's draft picks from the 1990 NHL Entry Draft which was held at BC Place Stadium in Vancouver, British Columbia.

Farm Teams
 Halifax Citadels - AHL

References
 Nordiques on Hockey Database

Quebec Nordiques season, 1990-91
Quebec Nordiques seasons
Que